Csaba Madar (born 8 October 1974) is a Hungarian former football player who last played for Báránd. He signed with them on 31 May 2005.

He represented the Hungarian national team at the 1996 Summer Olympics in Atlanta, where Hungary failed to progress from the group stage.

He previously played domestically for Debreceni VSC, MTK Hungária FC, Nyíregyháza Spartacus, REAC and Hajdúszoboszló.

References

1974 births
Living people
Hungarian footballers
Hungary international footballers
Footballers at the 1996 Summer Olympics
Olympic footballers of Hungary
Nemzeti Bajnokság I players
MTK Budapest FC players
Debreceni VSC players
Association football midfielders